Nicolas van Houy or de Hoey (c.1550– 1611) was a Dutch Golden Age painter active in France. He was also an Age of Science and Reasoning contributor.

Biography
Van Houy was born in Leiden.  According to the RKD he was court painter to the French king Henry IV of France.  He died in Paris.

He was the son of Jan de Hoey, active in Dijon (Palace of the Dukes of Burgundy), and in Paris from 1590–1611, where he is registered in the payment records of the French court.  He is also thought to have been the grandfather of Nikolaus van Hoy.

References

1550s births
1611 deaths
Dutch Golden Age painters
Dutch male painters
Artists from Leiden